Meterana tetrachroa is a species of moth of the family Noctuidae. This species is endemic to New Zealand. It is classified as "Data Deficient" by the Department of Conservation.

Taxonomy 
It was described by Edward Meyrick in 1931 from a female specimen collected by George Hudson at Waimarino National Park on 6 January 1930 and named Melanchra tetrachroa. Hudson discussed and illustrated this species under that name in his 1939 Supplement to the Butterflies and Moths of New Zealand. In 1971 John S. Dugdale transferred species in the genus Melanchra to Graphania. The holotype specimen is held at the Natural History Museum, London.

In 2017 it was explained that Graphania tetrachroa (Meyrick, 1931) may possibly be composed of two separate species. These are the described species G. tetrachora, known only from the type specimen mentioned above, and a species, currently undescribed but known as  "Graphania" cf. tetrachroa, classified as Nationally Vulnerable by the New Zealand Threat Classification System.  The reasoning given for this separation were the differences in wing pattern between the two entitles as well as the lack of variability in the known series of G. cf. tetrachroa. It was also argued that both entities belong in the genus Meterana. It is possible that further taxonomic work may show that these two entities belong to the same species.

In 2019 a paper published by Robert J. B. Hoare specifically addressed the genus placement of Graphania tetrachroa, known only from the type specimen. Hoare, having dissected the holotype specimen and studying the female genitalia, placed that species within the genus Meterana. The challenge of resolving the possible undescribed species currently known as "Graphania" cf. tetrachroa was left for a future date.

Description 
Meyrick originally described the adult female of the species as follows:

Distribution 
The species is endemic to New Zealand and has only been collected at Waimarino National Park.

Biology and behaviour 
The adult female of this species was on the wing in January. This species was collected using a sugar trap.

Conservation status 
In 2017 this species was classified as having the "Data Deficient" conservation status under the New Zealand Threat Classification System. In that document the species was treated as two separate entitles. The species now known as Meterana tetrachroa  was classified as "Data Deficient" and "Graphania" cf. tetrachroa was classified as "Nationally vulnerable".

References

Moths described in 1931
Hadeninae
Moths of New Zealand
Endemic fauna of New Zealand
Taxa named by Edward Meyrick
Endemic moths of New Zealand